ent-Estradiol (''ent''-E2), or 1-estradiol (1-E2), is an estrogen and the 1-enantiomorph of estradiol. It is a so-called "short-acting" or "impeded" estrogen, similarly to estriol, 17α-estradiol, and dimethylstilbestrol.

References

Abandoned drugs
Secondary alcohols
Estranes
Estrogens
Phenols